Lind is a surname.

It may also refer to:

Places
Lind, Herning, Herning, Denmark
Lind, Ahrweiler, Germany
Lind, Cologne, a city part of Porz, Cologne, Germany
Lind, Mayen-Koblenz, Mayen-Koblenz, Germany
Lind, Iran, a village in Mazandaran Province, Iran
Lind, Washington, United States
Lind, Wisconsin, United States, a town
Lind Center, Wisconsin, United States, an unincorporated community
Lind, Burnett County, Wisconsin, an unincorporated community
Lind Glacier, Antarctica
Lind Ridge, Antarctica
Lind National Park, Victoria, Australia

Fiction
Lind (Oh My Goddess!), a Valkyrie Goddess in the anime/manga series Oh My Goddess!
Lind L. Tailor, a minor character in the anime/manga series Death Note

See also
 Linde (disambiguation)
 Lindt (disambiguation)
 Lint (disambiguation)